Miss World 2006, the 56th edition of the Miss World pageant, was held on 30 September 2006 at the Sala Kongresowa, the main 2,897-seat auditorium of the Palace of Culture and Science in Warsaw, Poland. It was the first time ever that the pageant was held in the Continental Europe and a European city other than London, United Kingdom, having previously been held there in 2002 after the Nigeria Controversy. The pageant officially concluded after Taťána Kuchařová from the Czech Republic was crowned Miss World 2006 by outgoing titleholder Unnur Birna Vilhjálmsdóttir of Iceland.

A total of 104 countries competed in the pageant, the 12th largest number behind
2013 (127) 2014 (121), 2012 (116), 2010 (115), 2015 (114), 2011 (113), 2009 (112), 2008 (109), 2004 (107), and 2007 and 2003 (both 106). All contestants were divided in six regional groups: Africa, Americas, Asia Pacific, Caribbean, Northern Europe and Southern Europe.

Gdynia was the host of the Beach Beauty contest, Giżycko hosted the Miss Sports contest and Wrocław hosted the Miss Talent competition. The fourth event was Beauty with a Purpose.
This is the first time the Czech Republic won the title of Miss World.

Results

Placements

Continental Queens of Beauty

Special awards 
Best World Dress Designer

Challenge Events

Fast Track Events
During the month of September four competitions were held from which the winner of each was fast tracked into the semi-finals. Beach Beauty was selected on 7 September in the city of Gdynia. Miss Sports was held on 12 September in the city of Gizycko and the Miss Talent contest was celebrated on 20 September at Wrocław. The Beauty with a Purpose winner was announced on 30 September during the final telecast.

Beach Beauty

Miss Sports

Miss Talent

Beauty with a Purpose

Judges
 Julia Morley – Chairwoman of the Miss World Organization
 Aneta Kreglicka – Miss World 1989 from Poland
 Denise van Outen – Actress and TV presenter
 Karan Johar – Leading Indian director known worldwide for his award-winning movies
 Kelly Holmes – British multiple Olympic gold medalist
 Krish Naidoo – Miss World International Ambassador
 Louis Walsh – Irish entertainment manager behind some of the world's leading pop acts
 Mike Dixon – West End and Broadway award-winner musical director
 Wilnelia Merced – Miss World 1975 from Puerto Rico

Contestants
104 contestants competed for the title.

Notes

Withdrawals
 –  Miss Egypt 2006, Fawzia Mohamed had visa problems.
  - Miss World Belize 2006, Felicita (Leesha) Arzu was crowned on 29 July, but the organizers decided that she would take part at Miss World 2007.

No Shows:
  – No contest
  - No contest
  – Due to financial problems.
  –  Martha Ramirez
  - Ramata Barry
  - No contest
  –  Eboundt Fatouma Blanda 
 - Alima Diomandé
  - Peth Msiska
  – No contest due to the Nepalese Civil War. It was postponed until 2007.
  - No contest
  - Due to Financial problems.
  – Due to Financial problems.
  – No contest
  - Due to scheduling conflicts, the national pageant was held on 9 September making the 2006 winner ineligible to compete, plus no finalists of Miss Switzerland 2005 pageant were available to compete. After that Switzerland did not send a contestant to the Miss World contest until 2013.
  – No contest

Replacements
  – Miss France 2004, Laetitia Bleger was appointed to represent France at Miss World 2006, but however her Playboy pictures of May 2005 prevented her from taking part and she got suspended for 6 months by the Miss France Organization. Then the Miss France committee named the new Miss France 2006, Alexandra Rosenfeld as the French representative in Miss World 2006, but due to the fact that she had to go first to Miss Universe 2006 and later to Miss Europe 2006 contest, was finally replaced by her 2nd Runner up - Laura Fasquel.
  – Miss Latvia 2005, Kristīne Djadenko was supposed to participate in Miss World 2006. However a month before the start of the competition was replaced by Līga Meinarte. Nevertheless, Djadenko participated next year at Miss World 2007.
  – Miss España 2006, Elizabeth Reyes was supposed to participate in Miss World 2006 after the Miss Universe 2006 contest. However she was replaced by her 1st Runner up - Inmaculada Torres.
  – Miss Uruguay Mundo 2006, Soledad Gagliardo was replaced by her first runner up, Marlene Politi for unknown reasons.

References

External links
 Pageantopolis – Miss World 2006

Miss World
2006 in Poland
2006 beauty pageants
Beauty pageants in Poland
September 2006 events in Europe
2000s in Warsaw